The Man with Nine Lives may refer to:
The Man with Nine Lives (film), a 1940 film with Boris Karloff
"The Man with Nine Lives" (Battlestar Galactica), an episode of the original Battlestar Galactica TV series guest-starring Fred Astaire
The Man with Nine Lives, a novel by Harlan Ellison
The Man with Nine Lives, an episode of Mona the Vampire